DeKalb Academy of Technology and Environment (DATE) is a charter school located at 1492 Kelton Drive in Stone Mountain, Georgia, United States. The school has about 800 students in kindergarten through eighth grades (as of the 2017-2018 school year).

In October 2008, Kathy Cox recognized the school as a top 10 school in Georgia for math and science. The school has the vision to be recognized as one of the top 10 charter schools in the nation. DATE was named by the Know Magazine Education Guide as being Metro Atlanta's Best Public School for 8th Grade in DeKalb County. DATE's 8th grade class ranked #1 in Reading and #9 in math on the GCRCT. DeKalb Academy of Technology and Environment Elementary and Middle Charter Schools was featured in the book The Places and Faces of DeKalb County Georgia, highlighting its academic success, environmental and technology focus, and parental participation. DATE was selected to have a playground built by KABOOM and sponsored by Dr. Pepper Snapple Group. DATE students outperformed elementary and middle school students collectively in the DeKalb County School District and State Technology Fair. The school is accredited by AdvancED.

Academics
The mission of the school is to give its students a background in technology and study of the environment by engaging in environmental projects. Technology supports all core learning areas. The specials area classes that all students participate in are technology, band (if chosen), art, French, health, music, environmental science, and physical education. The school has a special Discovery Gifted Program for those who have been identified as gifted by DeKalb County School District and Georgia Department of Education standards.

The school band consists of three levels, beginner, intermediate, and advanced. The band is for the 5th-8th grades. The band takes part in many activities like parades, performances, and competitions. They took second place in a regional band competition on April 25, 2009.

Specialized academic programs include the full implementation of all Common Core Standards with the addition of FOSS science and Everyday Mathematics curriculums.

Clubs, organizations, and extracurricular activities
The school's clubs include the National Beta Club (Junior Beta), Technology Club, and Girl Scouts of the USA (Brownies, Daisies and Juniors), Robotics, Recycling Club, STEAM Team, Broadcasting, Yearbook, Little Miss Sunshine, Young Generals, Performing Arts, Legos, and Boy Scouts of America 1833 (Boy Scouts and cub scouts - tiger cub and junior cub). Since 2007, the school has participated in an Atlanta area sports program which includes basketball, flag football, Track and field, Kilometer Kids, and cheerleading, which are all co-ed. Students must maintain a grade-point average of at least 3.0 to participate.

Setting
The school grounds suggest the school's connection with environmental education is evident. Features include large vegetable gardens, shade garden, flower and herb garden, hydroponics and aquaponics learning stations, and a chicken coop (with live chickens and roosters). Education includes plants, animals, and living things. The setting of the school and its grounds are not the traditional school setting. Each class has the responsibility of participating in recycling, gardening, and six-week environmental themes. To link with technology, every classroom has an electronic Interwrite smart board with student response systems. There are computers and iMacs in every classroom. Classroom sets of Google Chrome Books and Lenovos are available for students and teachers.

References

External links
 Official site
 Just Listen News

Public elementary schools in Georgia (U.S. state)
Public middle schools in Georgia (U.S. state)
Schools in DeKalb County, Georgia
Charter schools in Georgia (U.S. state)